Zabukovje pri Raki is a settlement in the hills west of Raka in the Municipality of Krško in eastern Slovenia. The area is part of the traditional region of Lower Carniola. It is now included with the rest of the municipality in the Lower Sava Statistical Region.

Name
The name of the settlement was changed from Zabukovje to Zabukovje pri Raki in 1953.

References

External links
Zabukovje pri Raki on Geopedia

Populated places in the Municipality of Krško